John David Shaw (born 24 April 1962) is an English former field hockey player.

Shaw represented Great Britain in the 1992 Summer Olympics in Barcelona and the 1996 Summer Olympics in Atlanta. He also won a silver medal with England at the 1986 World Cup.
He also won an Olympic gold medal in Seoul.

Shaw was born in Taiping, Perak, Malaysia. He is working as a Hockey Coach at Bradfield College, and also coaches at Gerrards Cross Hockey Club. He has previously worked as a coach for Southgate Hockey Club Men's 1st XI and for Oxford University Hockey Club.

References

External links
 
 

1962 births
Living people
Malaysian people of Indian descent
British male field hockey players
Field hockey players at the 1992 Summer Olympics
Field hockey players at the 1996 Summer Olympics
Olympic field hockey players of Great Britain
Southgate Hockey Club players